Laure of Chabanais (died 1316), was a Countess regnant suo jure of Bigorre in 1283-1307.

References

 Foundation for Medieval Genealogy : Comtes de Bigorre

1316 deaths
Counts of Bigorre
13th-century women rulers
14th-century women rulers
Year of birth unknown